List of the vascular plants of Britain and Ireland #5 — this page's list covers the dicotyledon family Rosaceae.

Status key: * indicates an introduced species and e indicates an extirpated species.

Rosaceae species

References

External links
 

05